7 Dney is a Russian language newspaper published in Belarus. The paper is published by the ministry of information.

References

Newspapers published in Belarus
Russian-language newspapers published in Belarus